Larry Kenney (born August 5, 1947) is an American voice actor and radio personality.

Early life
Larry Kenney was born August 5, 1947 in Pekin, Illinois, the son of George and Joyce Kenney. He has a brother, Steven, and a sister, Jody. He graduated from Pekin Community High School. He attended Western Illinois University but did not graduate.

Career
In 1963, Kenney began his radio career at the age of 15 as a disc jockey at WIRL in Peoria, Illinois. After WIRL, he worked at WOWO, Fort Wayne, Indiana; WKYC (AM, now WTAM), Cleveland, Ohio (1970–1973); WHN, New York City; WYNY, New York City; WJJD (now WYLL), Chicago, Illinois; and WKHK (now WLTW), New York City until 1972.

Kenney was part of the regular cast on the Imus in the Morning radio show from 1973 to 2007, where he recorded impersonations of dozens of characters, including General George Patton, Andy Rooney, and Ross Perot.

Also in 1973, Kenney joined 1050 WHN (now WEPN), a country music station in New York City. He originally announced the afternoon drive-time, before taking over the prestigious morning drive-time in 1974. His show was a hit, not only for the music, but also for his comical characters who "joined" him while performing his deejay duties. Billboard named him Best Country Disc Jockey "at a station in a metropolitan area of one million, or more" in 1976 and Best Country Music Personality in 1978. He stayed at WHN until the fall of 1979, when he moved to WYNY to host the morning slot for a year before moving to WKHK's (now WLTW) morning show. He was the host of the New York edition of the television show Bowling for Dollars on WOR-TV (now WWOR-TV) from 1976 to 1979.

He is also known for his voice work as Lion-O on the 1980s Rankin/Bass cartoon ThunderCats, and Karate Kat, a martial arts blackbelt cat featured as part of The Comic Strip. He was also the voice of Bluegrass in SilverHawks and Dolph in TigerSharks. Kenney also did voice work for several breakfast cereal characters, including Count Chocula and Sonny the Cuckoo Bird. In recent years, he has reprised this role for humorous ThunderCats references on the animated series Family Guy. In the 2011 ThunderCats animated series on Cartoon Network, Kenney returned to the series, but as Claudus, Lion-O's and Tygra's father.

Kenney provided voice-overs for The State, the 1990s sketch comedy cult classic which featured his daughter, Kerri Kenney. He was also the announcer for VH1's Best Week Ever during its run from 2004 to 2009, and provides introductions for Westwood One's radio coverage of Monday Night Football and various other commercial work, including for Skittles and Campbell's soup. He was the announcer for The Beat 102.7 in the video game Grand Theft Auto IV and K.T.I. Radio in the L.A. Noire. He also gives the voice to JB Cripps in Red Dead Online, the online component of Red Dead Redemption 2.

In 2008, he was hired to do an impersonation of Mark Twain for a gala held by the Mark Twain House and Museum.

Personal life
He and his wife Carol Ann Jacobs Kenney have three children: daughters Kerri and Ashley, and son Tanner. Kerri, the eldest, is an actress, best known for her work on the series Reno 911! and The State. Ashley works in the nonprofit sector and is the bassist and singer for the band Witch Hair out of New Haven, Connecticut. Tanner did a voice of the Intelligent Agenda Caller in the video game Grand Theft Auto IV. Kenney now lives in New Canaan, Connecticut.

Filmography

Film

Television

Video games

References

External links

Interviews

 Larry Kenney e-mail interview (2000) on Thundercatslair.com
 Larry Kenney interview (2002) on Matt Blank website
 Larry Kenney audio interview with Nick Mills (2008) on Thundercatslair.com
 Larry Kenney interview (c. 2008) with Rob Shan Lone on insomniacmania.com — transcript
 "ThunderCat Has His Tongue" (2009) with Don E. Smith Jr. on Cosmic Booknews

1947 births
American game show hosts
American impressionists (entertainers)
Radio personalities from Illinois
American male voice actors
Game show announcers
Living people
Actors from Peoria, Illinois
People from Pekin, Illinois
People from Westport, Connecticut